Harbin Medical University (HMU) is a public university located in Harbin, Heilongjiang, China.

HMU is appointed as a national education and training base for biomedical scientists and teaching talents by the National Bureau of Advanced Health Care Education, and a key university of Heilongjiang Province in the national "211 Project".

History 
Harbin Medical University (HMU) is located in Harbin, Heilongjiang province. HMU has a scenic green campus of 2.36 million square meters with buildings of ancient architecture styles.

HMU was founded in 1926. It originated from the merger of the old Harbin Medical University (a.k.a. Harbin Special Medical School, founded by a pioneer medical doctor in China, Dr. Lien-teh Wu) and the former first and second branch schools of Xingshan Chinese Medical University (a.k.a. Chinese Red Army Health School founded in 1931 in Ruijin, Jiangxi). In the 80 years of its history, HMU has inherited Dr. Lien-teh Wu’s spirit to "love the motherland wholeheartedly and to succeed through self-help," and has carried forward Chinese Red Army Health School's traditions of firm political belief and excellent medical expertise. The motto of today's HMU encourages "integrity with principles and constant learning to advance medical practice." HMU has been fast growing in terms of clinical and academic strength and has become a top ranking medical school with a large training capacity and distinctly characteristic training programs and curriculum design.

Academics

Affiliated Institutions 

The affiliated institutions of HMU includes: 
School of Basic Medical Sciences
School of Public Health
School of Pharmacy
School of Health Administration
Department of Bioinformatics
Department of Humanities and Social Sciences
Graduate School
School of Adult Education (School of Continuing Education)
Six medical schools (Affiliated hospitals)
School of Dentistry
School of Nursing
Daqing Campus

Organizations based in HMU includes:
Center for Endemic Disease Control of CDC
National Research Center for Clinical Trial of New Drugs
Russian Language Training Center of the Ministry of Health
Heilongjiang Branch of China Medical Academy
College of International Education
Heilongjiang Provincial Medical Academy

Reputation & Recognition 
Harbin Medical University is enlisted in the official medical directories of World Health Organization
(WHO), International Medical Education Directory (IMED) and World Directory of Medical Schools (WDOMS).

Its Doctor of Medicine (M.D.) degree is recognized by the Medical Council of India (MCI), Bangladesh, Jordan and many other Asian countries without a requirement for degree audition and validation. In countries of North America, Europe or other continents, such as USA, Canada, UK, Australia, M.D. graduates of HMU can obtain a medical license after passing specific board exams required in those countries.

Membership 
Harbin Medical University is a full member of the following international organizations and associations:
 Asian Medical Education Association (AMEA)
 Educational Commission for Foreign Medical Graduates (ECFMG)
 Foundation for Advancement of International Medical Education and Research (FAIMER)
 Association of Sino-Russian Medical Universities (ASRMU)

Medical Programs 

HMU has clearly defined medical programs. It is among the first group of medical universities with a seven-year medical program and has been working with Nankai University and Harbin Institute of Technology in jointly teaching these seven-year program students (ended in 2012). HMU cooperates with five foreign universities for joint medical programs. It has four first-grade doctorate degree programs including basic medical sciences, clinical medicine, public health and preventive medicine, and biology; 41 second-grade doctorate degree programs, and 49 second-grade master's degree programs. The 11 undergraduate programs include basic medical sciences, clinical medicine, preventive medicine, dentistry, anesthesiology, medical imaging, nursing, pharmacy, biotechnology, public affairs management, and medical law. Currently, HMU has five postdoctoral research programs in preventive medicine, clinical medicine, basic medical sciences, biology, and pharmacy, one research program in clinical pharmacy and pharmacology, and the postdoctoral research program in collaboration with Zhonglong Enterprises. There are over 10,000 full-time students, including over 3000 graduate students.

HMU has a reasonable discipline structure. There is one national key discipline, 32 provincial key disciplines, one incubation base of national key laboratories in biomedicine jointly established by the ministry and the province, six key laboratories of the ministry and the province, and 11 provincial key laboratories of higher education. Positions are available for national and provincial specially-invited professors.
Undergrade five-year MBBS programme is available in English language. Chinese language MBBS programme is also available.

The following three-year MD/MS & PhD specialties are available in English:
 School of Clinical Medicine
 Pathology and Pathophysiology, Pediatrics, Gerontology, Neurology, Psychiatry and Mental Health, Dermatology and Venereology, Imaging and Nuclear Medicine, Clinical Laboratory Diagnostics, Nursing, Surgery, Gynecology and Obstetrics, Otolaryngology, Oncology, Emergency Medicine, Oral Clinical Medicine, Nutrition and Food Hygiene, Master of Nursing, Social Medicine and Health Management, Master of Nursing, Clinical Science of Stomatology

 School of Basic Medical Sciences
 Physiology, Neurobiology, Genetics, Developmental Biology, Cell Biology, Biochemistry and Molecular Biology, Human Anatomy and Histoembryology, Immunology, Pathogen Biology, Pathology and Pathophysiology, Forensic Medicine, History of Science and Technology

 School of Public Health
 Pathogen Biology, Labor Sanitation and Sanitary Science, Nutrition and Food Hygiene, Maternal Child, Adolescent and Woman Health Care, Hygiene Toxicology, Master of Public Health (professional degree), Social Medicine and Health Services Management

 Center for Epidemic Disease
 Epidemic and Health Statistics, Labor Sanitation and Sanitary Science, Determination of Trace Elements and the Effect on Health

 School of Pharmacy
 Physiology, Pharmacochemistry, Pharmacy, Microbial and Biochemical Pharmacy, Pharmacology
 Master in Pharmacy (Professional Degree)

 School of Biological Information and Technology
 Biophysics, Biomedical Engineering

 School of Humanity and Social Sciences
 Ideological and Political Education

Faculty 
The over 10,000 faculty and staff include a combination of newly trained members and seasoned professionals. HMU faculty proudly includes one academician of the Chinese Academy of Engineering and one Nightingale Prize winner. Over 70 faculty members have been granted various prizes including Chinese Outstanding Young Teacher Award, Wu Jieping Medical Research Award, and Paul Jassen Award in Pharmacy.

Scientific Achievements 
HMU has made remarkable scientific achievements. Significant breakthroughs have been made in China Human Genome Project, cytogenetical research on solid tumor, basic and clinical research on series of spleen preservation operation, experiment and clinical application of homogeneous in situ heart transplantation, research on the best target of antiarrhythmic drugs and etiology of Kaschin-Beck disease. In order to make full use of HMU resources, HMU cooperates with some enterprises, e.g. the Pharmaceutical R&D Center between HMU and Harbin Pharmaceutical Group, to facilitate the transformation of pharmaceutical technology to new products and lead the pharmaceutical industry at the northeastern old industrial base to rapid development. Since 2000, HMU has been granted 3 second-class awards of National Scientific and Technological Progress, 3 second-class awards of National Natural Science, over 240 research achievement awards of the ministry and the province. HMU has undertaken over 250 projects of the national Project “973”, Project “863”, and key projects of National Natural Science Foundation.

HMU boasts advanced clinical technology. The five medical schools (affiliated hospitals) are ranked at top level; three are listed among the “100 best hospitals” in China. There are over 5000 beds, two million outpatients and over two-hundred thousand inpatients per year. Allogeneic organ transplantation is a speciality of HMU. Allogeneic spleen transplantation, allogeneic both-hands transplantation, and allogeneic single-forearm transplantation have reached international renown. Patients who receive allogeneic heart transplantation go on to enjoy the best life quality in Asia. The combined treatment of large intestine cancer is well known in China. There are 2905 beds in the other four non-affiliated clinical hospitals.

During the Tenth Five-Year Plan period, HMU was appraised as excellent in the assessment on seven-year medical program by the Ministry of Education, the assessment on the National Base of Science at HMU by the National Natural Science Foundation, and the assessment of basic medical education by the Ministry of Education. HMU enjoys a good reputation in its educational quality. As the first medical school in China, HMU received the pilot accreditation on basic medical education referenced by WFME Global Standards, and has achieved all 36 WFME basic standards, of which 25 have reached quality improvement standards. The foreign experts spoke highly of the medical education quality of the university. HMU has cooperative relations with over 40 colleges and universities in 12 countries or regions. Six specialized journal offices including Chinese Journal of Endemiology, International Journal of Genetics, and International Journal of Immunology are based at HMU. The campus network has been integrated into China Education and Research Network. HMU library has a collection of over 1.5 million books, 4707 journals and 330,000 electronic journals and books and provides electronic literature search and internet information services.

HMU adheres to the educational ideology “basic medical education as the basis, discipline developments as the fundamental, graduate and long-term medical education as the priority.” To meet the health needs of the region and country as well as economic development, HMU has become a base to cultivate skilled medical professionals and produce high-level research outcomes. HMU goals are to become the premiere teaching and research-oriented medical school in China that is renowned throughout the world. HMU will apply all of its advantages to achieving the objective of “rapid and all-around development” and rejuvenation of the old northeastern industrial base.

Rankings and reputation

CUAA (Chinese Universities Alumni Association) 
Universities Ranking of China released by CUAA (Chinese Universities Alumni Association, Chinese: 中国校友会网) is one of the most foremost domestic university rankings in China.

Nature Index 
Nature Index tracks the affiliations of high-quality scientific articles and presents research outputs by institution and country on monthly basis.

U.S. News & World Report Best Global Universities Ranking

References

External links 
HMU Video : https://www.youtube.com/watch?v=nuVCaRDQEPU
edXcare : https://www.youtube.com/watch?v=yr6ZiRKv0B4
HMU Website : http://www.hrbmu.edu.cn/

 
Universities in China with English-medium medical schools
Universities and colleges in Harbin
Educational institutions established in 1926
1926 establishments in China